Bolshoye Voroshnino is a rural locality (a village) in Verkhnevarzhenskoye Rural Settlement, Velikoustyugsky District, Vologda Oblast, Russia. The population was 16 as of 2002.

Geography 
Bolshoye Voroshnino is located 75 km southeast of Veliky Ustyug (the district's administrative centre) by road. Marilovo is the nearest rural locality.

References 

Rural localities in Velikoustyugsky District